James Atkinson (27 April 1914 – 30 July 2011) was an English Anglican priest, biblical scholar, and theologian specialising in Martin Luther and the Protestant Reformation. He was Professor of Biblical Studies at the University of Sheffield from 1967 to 1979, Canon Theologian of Sheffield Cathedral from 1970 to 1993, and Director of the Centre for Reformation Studies in Sheffield from 1983 to 2006.

Early life
Atkinson was born on 27 April 1914 in Tynemouth, Northumberland. He was the eldest of three sons born to Nicholas Ridley Atkinson, a civil engineer with the Tynemouth Improvement Commission, and his wife Margaret. He was educated at Tynemouth High School. He then went to St John's College, Durham, where he studied theology. He became captain of boats at the college's boat club.

One of his brothers was Sir Robert Atkinson, a decorated Royal Navy officer and businessman. The other brother died during the Second World War, in March 1943, when the merchant ship on which he was serving was torpedoed and sank.

Ecclesiastical career
Atkinson was ordained a deacon in the Church of England in 1937 and a priest in 1938. He was a curate at Holy Cross Church, Fenham, Newcastle, from 1937 to 1941. He continued his studies at the University of Durham and completed a Master of Arts (MA) degree in 1939. In 1941, he joined the clergy of Sheffield Cathedral. He was succentor for one year, before serving as precentor from 1942 to 1944.

He died on 30 July 2011.

Works

References

1914 births
2011 deaths
20th-century Anglican theologians
20th-century Christian biblical scholars
20th-century English Anglican priests
20th-century English historians
20th-century English theologians
Academics of the University of Sheffield
Alumni of St John's College, Durham
Anglican biblical scholars
British historians of religion
Canons (priests)
English Anglican theologians
English biblical scholars
People from Tynemouth
Reformation historians
University of Münster alumni